Lyudmila Gudz (born September 10, 1969) is a Russian handball player who competed for the Unified Team in the 1992 Summer Olympics.

In 1992 she won the bronze medal with the Unified Team, she played all five matches and scored five goals.

References

External links
profile

Russian female handball players
Olympic handball players of the Unified Team
Handball players at the 1992 Summer Olympics
Olympic bronze medalists for the Unified Team